Eswatini is a member of the United Nations, the Commonwealth of Nations, the African Union, the Common Market for Eastern and Southern Africa, and the Southern African Development Community. Currently, the Kingdom of Eswatini maintains 11 embassies and High Commissions along with 15 consulates and other representations around the world, while there are five embassies and High Commissions in Eswatini as well as 14 consulates and other representations.

Bilateral relations

Swazi embassies, High Commissions, and consulates abroad

 ; in Brussels, Belgium
 ; in Copenhagen, Denmark
 ; in Nairobi, Kenya
 ; in Kuala Lumpur, Malaysia
 ; in Maputo, Mozambique
 ; in New Delhi, India
 ; in Pretoria, South Africa
 ; in Taipei, Republic of China (Taiwan)
 ; in London, United Kingdom
 ; in Abu Dhabi, United Arab Emirates
  United Nations; in New York City, the United States
 ; in Washington, DC, the United States

Foreign embassies, High Commissions, and consulates in Eswatini

 Republic of China (Taiwan); in Mbabane, Eswatini
 Republic of Mozambique; in Mbabane, Eswatini
 Republic of India; in Mbabane, Eswatini
 Republic of South Africa; in Mbabane, Eswatini
 United States of America; in Mbabane, Eswatini

Eswatini and the Commonwealth of Nations

Eswatini was a British protectorate until 1968, when it became an independent native monarchy within the Commonwealth of Nations, when the then Paramount Chief of Swaziland, Sobhuza II became King of Swaziland.

See also

List of diplomatic missions in Eswatini
List of diplomatic missions of Eswatini

References

External links
UN list of Swaziland's Missions, Embassies, and High Commissions Overseas

 
Eswatini and the Commonwealth of Nations